Liar’s Edge is a 1992 Canadian thriller drama film written and directed by Ron Oliver and featuring Shannon Tweed and David Keith.

Cast
Nick Shields as Mark Burnz
Shannon Tweed as Heather Burnz
David Keith as Gary Kirkpatrick
Joseph Bottoms as Dave Kirkpatrick 
Christopher Plummer as Harry Weldon

References

External links
 
 

Canadian thriller films
English-language Canadian films
Films directed by Ron Oliver
1990s English-language films
1990s Canadian films